Sir Roger Allen KCMG (17 August 1909 – 9 February 1972) was a British diplomat who was ambassador to Greece, Iraq and Turkey.

Career
Roger Allen was educated at Repton School and studied modern languages at Corpus Christi College, Cambridge. He then studied law at the Inner Temple and was called to the bar in 1937. During World War II he served as a temporary staff member at the Foreign Office; after the war he stayed on in the Foreign Service and served two years at Moscow before returning to London.

Allen was deputy British High Commissioner in West Germany in 1954. After the end of the Allied occupation regime and the restoration of German sovereignty in 1954, the British High Commission in Bonn became the British Embassy and Allen was Minister (deputy head of mission) 1955–56. He was Ambassador to Greece 1957–61 and Ambassador to Iraq 1961–65. While in Iraq he is reported have been aware of, or even supported, a plot against the Prime Minister Abd al-Karim Qasim which culminated in the February 1963 coup d'état in which Qasim was overthrown and killed.

Allen was Deputy Under-Secretary of State (Middle East and Africa) at the Foreign Office 1965–67, and Ambassador to Turkey 1967–69. He then retired from the Diplomatic Service and was director-general of the Middle East Association (a British business group) from 1970 until his death.

Honours
Allen was appointed CMG in 1950 and knighted KCMG in the New Year Honours of 1957.

References
ALLEN, Sir Roger, Who Was Who, A & C Black, 1920–2015; online edn, Oxford University Press, 2014

Sir Roger Allen (obituary), The Times, London, 10 February 1972, page 16

External links

1909 births
1972 deaths
People educated at Repton School
Alumni of Corpus Christi College, Cambridge
Ambassadors of the United Kingdom to Greece
Ambassadors of the United Kingdom to Iraq
Ambassadors of the United Kingdom to Turkey
Knights Commander of the Order of St Michael and St George